Malakwal Junction railway station is located in Malakwal city, Mandi Bahauddin district of Punjab province, Pakistan.

See also
 List of railway stations in Pakistan
 Pakistan Railways

References

Railway stations in Mandi Bahauddin District
Railway stations on Shorkot–Lalamusa Branch Line
Railway stations on Malakwal–Khushab branch line